The Cowley College Tigers are the sports teams of Cowley College located in Arkansas City, Kansas, United States. They participate in the National Junior College Athletic Association and in the Kansas Jayhawk Community College Conference. The Cowley Tigers baseball team won two consecutive NJCAA World Series Championships in 1997 and 1998. The Cowley College volleyball team won the NJCAA DII National Championship in 2011 and 2013.

Sports

Men's sports
 Baseball
 Basketball
 Cross country
 Soccer
 Tennis
 Track & field (indoor/outdoor)
 Wrestling

Women's sports
 Basketball
 Cross country
 Soccer
 Softball
 Tennis
 Track & field (indoor/outdoor)
 Volleyball

Facilities
Cowley College has six athletics facilities (5 stadiums, 1 training facility).
 Hafner Training Center – training facility for all sports
 Lady Tigers Softball Field – home of the Lady Tigers softball team
 JC Louderback Tennis Center – home of the Tigers tennis teams
 Sports Complex – home of the Tigers soccer and track & field teams
 Tiger Ball Park – home of the Tigers baseball team
 William S. Scott Auditorium – home of the Tigers men's and women's basketball and women's volleyball teams

Notable persons

 Tyrus McGee (born 1991), basketball player in the Israel Basketball Premier League

References

External links
 

Sports teams in Kansas